Harold Leslie Peterson (1922–1978) was a historian widely considered in his day to be a foremost expert on firearms and related subjects in American history.

Peterson was born in Peekskill, New York, on May 22, 1922.  He attended Drew University in Madison, New Jersey, where he was an undefeated varsity fencer in foil and saber. His education was interrupted by a nine-month tour of active duty during World War II. He graduated from Drew with an AB magna cum laude in 1945. He then went to work at the Wisconsin Historical Society while simultaneously pursuing an MA in history at the University of Wisconsin, which he received in 1947.

In 1949, Peterson co-founded a group which eventually formalized into the Company of Military Historians. He served on the Board of Governors for the organization from 1949 to 1972 and as President from 1960 to 1963. He was also elected a Fellow of the organization in 1957.

Peterson's entire professional career was with the National Park Service. From 1963 until his death in 1978 he held the title of Curator.  During his career he was consultant to many organizations and museums as an expert on historical arms and armor. In addition to his particular focus on arms, he was also a general promoter of the history mission of the Park Service, and was a leader of the Eastern National Park and Monument Association.

Peterson's interest, writings and research in military history went well beyond the range of arms and armor, to include military music and drinks of soldiers. He recorded his own performances of classic military music, and he wrote a book on drinks called Cups of Valor under the pseudonym N. E. Beveridge.

When Peterson died on January 1, 1978, he was survived by his wife, Dorothy Parker Peterson, a son Harold L. Jr., a daughter, Kristin Smalley, and his parents, Dr. and Mrs. Leslie C. Peterson.

Bibliography
Books by Peterson:

 
 
  Free version at Project Gutenberg.

References

1922 births
1978 deaths
People from Peekskill, New York
Military personnel from New York (state)
Drew University alumni
 University of Wisconsin–Madison College of Letters and Science alumni
Writers from New York (state)
American military personnel of World War II